Marlene Weingärtner (born 30 January 1980) is a retired tennis player from Germany. She is a former top 40 player in both singles and doubles.

The most remarkable moment of her career was her first-round match at the 2003 Australian Open when she defeated there the defending champion Jennifer Capriati. Capriati led the encounter 6–2, 4–1, but Weingärtner fought back and won by a 2–6, 7–6, 6–4 scoreline. She eventually reached the third round.

Her best Grand Slam showings were two fourth-round appearances, the first in Melbourne 2002, the latter at the 2004 French Open. In 2004, she also reached her only WTA Tour final in Bali which she lost in straight sets to Svetlana Kuznetsova.

Playing for Germany in the Fed Cup, she has a win–loss record of 2–3.

Weingärtner retired after the 2005 US Open, after suffering several first-round losses due to ongoing physical problems. She made a brief return in July 2008 to play the doubles event of the Gastein Ladies tournament where she partnered Sandra Klemenschits, losing in the quarterfinals to Xu Yifan and Zhang Shuai.

WTA career finals

Singles: 1 (runner-up)

Doubles: 2 (1 title, 1 runner-up)

ITF Circuit finals

Singles: 5 (0–5)

Doubles: 7 (3–4)

References

External links
 
 
 

1980 births
Living people
Sportspeople from Heidelberg
German female tennis players
Tennis people from Baden-Württemberg